Scopelogadus beanii, or Bean's bigscale, is a species of ridgehead fish. It is named for Tarleton Hoffman Bean.

Description
It is one of the largest and deepest-dwelling ridgeheads. It has two dorsal spines, one anal spine, 10–11 dorsal soft rays and 7–9 anal soft rays. Its caudal peduncle (the tapered region behind the dorsal and anal fins where the caudal fin attaches to the body) is long. It has ridges of thin bones supporting deep mucous cavities on the head.

Habitat

Behaviour
Scopelogadus beanii feeds on amphipods, polychaetes, jellyfish and mysids.

References

Melamphaidae
Fish described in 1887
Taxa named by Albert Günther